Cheirotonia or Chirotonia etymologically means "hand-stretching." It acquired a few different meanings, which survive as technical terms:

 Christian laying on of hands, by which the authority of the Holy Spirit is considered passed between individuals, sometimes used in a secular sense to mean hand-picked succession
 ordination, the official investment by a religious group with authority as a leader of some sort, whether sacerdotal, ministerial, or other
 suffrage in the general sense, from assenting by a theoretical raising the hand, which was in fact implemented by a number of methods not involving hand-raising

Greek words and phrases